Rim of the World is a 2019 American science fiction adventure film directed by McG from a screenplay by Zack Stentz. It stars Jack Gore, Miya Cech, Benjamin Flores Jr. and Alessio Scalzotto. The film, which was Stentz's modern take on the kid-centered action films of the 1980s, was streamed on Netflix on May 24, 2019. It was the most watched content in the SVOD service in the UK the week it was released, overtaking the series Dead to Me and Riverdale.

Plot
 
Alex, a socially reclusive boy who recently lost his father in a fire, reluctantly attends a summer camp in southern California called "Rim of the World". He meets two other "misfits" - Zhen Zhen, an initially mute, adorable orphan girl from China, and Dariush, an outspoken boy from a rich family. One afternoon, while waiting to go canoeing in a lake, Zhen Zhen wanders off into the woods, looking for the lookout point she had seen on a camp poster, while Alex attempts to follow. He comes across Dariush, who happens to be nearby answering the call of nature. Dariush mistakenly tries to 'cure' Alex's fear of heights by making him stand near a cliff edge, and Gabriel, a boy they hadn't seen at camp before, intervenes. Zhen Zhen, hearing the commotion, comes back down and meets up with the boys. At that moment, they all receive alarming texts advising they immediately evacuate the area.

While hurrying back, they find out that other campers have left the lake, and they witness alien ships invading the valley. The kids head back to the camp, and afterward discover the camp to be empty of people - all except for Conrad, a camp counselor. Suddenly, a Dragon spacecraft fleeing the International Space Station lands heavily nearby. The dying astronaut inside the spacecraft gives Alex a key, with instructions that it should be taken to NASA's Jet Propulsion Lab (JPL) facility in Pasadena, and that it was the only way to destroy the aliens. An alien appears with its "dog" and kills the astronaut. Alex and his friends try to hide out and Conrad gets killed, but the kids manage to elude the aliens and escape the camp.

They make their way to the sheriff's office and discover an inmate, Lou, who has been left behind in the cells. Lou claims to have a son waiting for him, so an empathetic Alex decides to release him before the group continues on their way to JPL. Later, the group encounters Marines who are evacuating civilians. The commander gratefully takes the key and puts the children on a bus to safety. However, alien ships attack the vehicle convoy and the soldiers are killed, whereupon Alex retrieves the key from the dying commander and the group sets out for JPL once more. During the night, after briefly taking refuge in Gabriel's old house, Gabriel explains that he is an escapee from juvie, where he was placed due to a misunderstanding at his mother's store, in which a customer assumed Gabriel was attempting to steal his change at the deposit box, unaware of Gabriel's dyscalculia. Sometime after, they are attacked by a gang of masked individuals, led by Lou, who reveals himself as a murderous thief and tricked the group into releasing him. He agrees to let the kids go, but only if Alex gives him the key, which Lou thinks he can sell on the black market. Alex refuses and Lou attempts to kill Alex with a knife, but right before Lou attacks him, the alien from the camp appears and attacks them all. Lou and his men are killed, but the kids manage to escape after trapping the alien in a backyard swimming pool.

While they are walking in the forest, Dariush and Gabriel fight and Dariush reveals that his father lost their car dealership, meaning he will go to jail, hence the reason why Dariush was placed at camp. Suddenly, they receive on their transmitter an S.O.S. from the doctor at JPL they were instructed to give the key to, encouraging them to move forward with their journey. The kids walk into a mall and change clothes. After that, the group takes a Ford Mustang in the parking lot, which they discover Zhen Zhen is able to drive, to quickly journey the rest of the way to JPL, but they are again attacked by the pursuing alien. They abandon the vehicle while trying to escape the alien and realize that they left the key in the car. Dariush attempts to go alone to get the key, only to be injured by the alien in the process, but manages to get away with the key. The group finally make it to the JPL facility, but find that the doctor is dead, and his S.O.S. message was only a result of his blood dripping onto his transmitter. The kids are able to make radio contact with a general at NORAD, who explains that the key holds information that can be used to destroy the alien mothership in orbit via a Cold War defense project named Excalibur. Zhen Zhen goes into the basement to start the emergency generators, where she is attacked by an alien dog, while Alex goes to the roof to realign the communication dish, where he is attacked by the alien. Zhen Zhen manages to lock the dog in the basement and returns to the command room to help Gabriel and the injured Dariush insert the keys that will launch the Excalibur weapon.

Zhen Zhen, Dariush, and Gabriel evacuate the JPL building, while Alex lures the alien into an engine test room and kills it with the engine's exhaust. The teens watch from the ground as the alien mothership is blown up in the atmosphere. Alex is reunited with his mother and the children are celebrated as heroes.

Cast

Production
In March 2018, it was reported that McG would direct Rim of the World for Netflix from a screenplay by Zack Stentz. In an interview, Stentz revealed that he started working on the script as early as 2017 and the deal with Netflix was closed a year later. Principal production commenced in May 2018 in Los Angeles, California. In June 2018, the cast was announced.

Principal photography began in June 2018 and reportedly lasted 40 days.

Reception
The film had received negative reviews from critics. The website's critical consensus reads, "Rim of the World'' is too bland to live up to the 80s teen adventures it references, and too full of clichés to be able to set itself apart from them."

References

External links
 
 

2010s science fiction adventure films
2019 films
Alien invasions in films
2010s English-language films
Films about summer camps
Films directed by McG
Films about extraterrestrial life
Films set in California
Films shot in Los Angeles
English-language Netflix original films
Films scored by Bear McCreary
American science fiction adventure films
2010s American films